Anatoliy Pavlovych Shapiro (18 January 1913 – 8 October 2005), was a Ukrainian-born Jewish soldier of the Army of the Soviet Union, who led the first elements of the advancing army into the Nazi-developed Auschwitz concentration camp in Poland, during the latter stages of World War II. He was awarded two Orders of the Red Star; two Orders of the Patriotic War of the 1st degree, for the Liberation of Kraków; the Order of the Patriotic War of the 2nd degree, and numerous other medals.

Early life
Born to Jewish parents in the town of Kostyantynohrad (now Krasnohrad), Poltava Governorate (now Kharkiv region) which was then part of the Russian Empire, he graduated from the engineering-Pedagogical Institute (High School) in Zaporizhia, with a diploma as engineer-technologist.

Shapiro immediately enlisted for national service into the Red Army in 1935, where after study in Kharkiv, he was appointed to the rank of lieutenant. After three years national service, he remained as a volunteer in the Red Army, but worked as a civilian engineer in Zaporizhia and Dnipropetrovsk.

World War II
After the start of Operation Barbarossa, the Nazi-Wehrmacht invasion of the Soviet Union, Shapiro re-enlisted as a volunteer in the Red Army in October 1941. Assigned to 76 platoon equipped with tanks within the 6th marine infantry brigade, Lieutenant Shapiro commanded a specialist explosives and demolition unit, and was immediately sent to the front line. He became involved in fighting the incoming invasion, seeing action in Autumn 1941 at River Mostricì, where he destroyed an existing metal bridge and further Nazi temporary bridging efforts to slow the advancing Nazi troops.

As a result of his leadership during this action, Shapiro was appointed deputy commander of the infantry battalion, and a month later, the commander of the battalion. In this position he led the unit in defensive operations in the Battle of the Caucasus in the Kuban, including liberating the towns of Tuapse and Rostov-on-Don, and fighting around Taganrog on the Mius River in 1942.

During the Battle of Kursk in July 1943, Shapiro was injured, facilitating a period of recuperation in hospital. During this period the 76th brigade was disbanded, and so on his release Shapiro was sent to the Irkutsk Division Commander of the battalion, and then assigned to command the 500+ troops of the 100th rifle division of 106th rifle corps. At this time, the Red Army had the Nazi Wehrmacht in full retreat, and resultantly in command of this division under General F. M. Krasavin, Shapiro's division was the lead unit during the Red Army's liberation of much of Ukraine and Poland.

Liberation of Auschwitz concentration camp
As the Red Army advanced west closer to Oświęcim, the Nazis strengthened their defences greatly, hoping to win time to obliterate their crimes at Auschwitz concentration camp. Shapiro's specially trained division of 900 men led this advance, and took heavy losses from the retreating Wehrmacht over the last , reaching the mine-protected roads to Auschwitz on 27 January 1945, having lost half of his division in the previous few days action:

After World War II
After the war, Shapiro worked in a military plant, but was persecuted for years because of being Jewish. In 1992, his entire family decided to emigrate to the United States, settling in Suffolk County, Long Island, New York. It was only at this time that he discovered that the Holocaust had cost 6 million Jewish lives. As a result, Shapiro began writing Ukrainian, in his native language, eventually writing several books, mostly memoirs about the war. His last book is entitled Зловісний марафон (Ominous Marathon). Shapiro applied for American citizenship in 1996.

On 21 September 2006, Ukrainian President Viktor Yushchenko conferred on Shapiro the title of Hero of Ukraine.

Shapiro died on 8 October 2005 and is buried at Beth Moses cemetery in Suffolk County, Long Island, New York.

References

1913 births
2005 deaths
People from Poltava Governorate
Ukrainian Jews
Soviet Jews in the military
People from Krasnohrad
Recipients of the title of Hero of Ukraine
Recipients of the Cross of Merit (Poland)
Ukrainian emigrants to the United States